(Soar joyfully in the air), BWV 36.2 (formerly BWV 36a), is a lost secular cantata by Johann Sebastian Bach. He composed it in Leipzig and probably first performed it in Köthen on 30 November 1726.

History and text 

Bach composed the cantata while living in Leipzig. He retained a role as court composer to Leopold, Prince of Anhalt-Köthen, for whom he had worked full-time in the period 1717–1723. The cantata was written for the 24th birthday of the prince's second wife, Princess Charlotte Friederike Amalie of Nassau-Siegen on 30 November 1726, the likely date of the work's premiere, albeit undocumented.

The text, divided into nine movements, is by Christian Friedrich Henrici (Picander), who published it in his Ernst-Schertzhaffte und Satyrische Gedichte, Teil I of 1727.  The text is adapted from an earlier congratulatory cantata, presumably authored by Picander, for which Bach's music survives.

Aria: 
Recitative: 
Aria: 
Recitative: 
Aria: 
Recitative: 
Aria: 
Recitative: 
Aria:

Scoring and structure 
Although the cantata is lost, we have some idea of what it sounded like. When Bach wrote for a one-off occasion such as a birthday, he sometimes recycled the music in another composition. In this case there appear to be several related works.
 the secular cantata  (performed in Leipzig, probably in 1725 a year before the Kothen version),
 the secular cantata  
 two versions of the church cantata for the first Sunday in Advent, .

The extant cantatas use woodwinds and strings, and it is possible that the lost cantata was similarly scored, although the court's permanent band had been reduced since the time Bach was based at Köthen; he may have had fewer instrumentalists at his disposal than at Leipzig.

Grychtolik adapted the music from Schwingt freudig euch empor, BWV 36c and composed new recitatives. He performed his reconstruction at Köthen's Bach Festival in 2012, and released a recording (see recordings section below).

Recordings 
Mitteldeutsche Hofmusik, Alexander Grychtolik. Ruhm und Glück. Rondeau, 2012. This album takes its title from the other work recorded, the birthday cantata of 1718, .

References

Sources 

Scores
 

General
 Cantata BWV 36a Steigt freudig in die Luft: history, scoring, sources for text and music, translations to various languages, discography, discussion, Bach Cantatas Website
 Steigt freudig in die Luft: history, scoring, Bach website 
 BWV 36a Steigt freudig in die Luft: English translation, University of Vermont
 BWV 36a Steigt freudig in die Luft: text, scoring, University of Alberta 

Secular cantatas by Johann Sebastian Bach
1726 compositions
Lost musical works by Johann Sebastian Bach